The MV Illahee was a  operated by Washington State Ferries.

Originally built as the MV Lake Tahoe in Oakland, California for the Southern Pacific Railroad, she started out serving on SP's Golden Gate Ferries subsidiary on San Francisco Bay.  She was purchased by the Puget Sound Navigation Company in 1940, and she was moved to Puget Sound and renamed the MV Illahee until Washington State Ferries acquired and took over operations in 1951.

She was serving on the inter-island route in the San Juan Islands when the entire Steel Electric class was withdrawn from service on November 20, 2007 due to hull corrosion issues.

In the summer of 2009, the Illahee and her sisters were sold to Eco Planet Recycling, Inc. of Chula Vista, California.  In August 2009 the ferry was towed out of Eagle Harbor and was scrapped in Ensenada, Mexico.

Notes

References
 Kline, Mary S., and Bayless, G.A., Ferryboats -- A Legend on Puget Sound, Bayless Books, Seattle, WA 1983

See also

Washington State Ferries vessels
1927 ships
Puget Sound Navigation Company
Ships built in Oakland, California